The Governor General's Award for English-language poetry or drama was a Canadian literary award that annually recognized one Canadian writer for a work of poetry or drama published in English. It was one of the Governor General's Awards for Literary Merit from 1937 to 1980 (publication years, which conventionally date the awards). After 1980 it was divided into the award for English-language poetry and award for English-language drama. The Governor General's Awards program is administered by the Canada Council for the Arts.

The program was created in 1937 and inaugurated that November for 1936 publications in two English-language categories, conventionally called the 1936 awards. The poetry or drama award was introduced one year later, as one of three 1937 Governor General's Awards.

Winners

1930s

1940s

1950s

1960s

1970s

1980s

References

External links
 Governor General award winners at Faded Page

English
English
Awards established in 1937
1937 establishments in Canada
Awards disestablished in the 1980s
1980 disestablishments in Canada
Drama